Binary vector may mean:
In computer science: a bit array or bit vector
In biotechnology: a transfer DNA binary system